Samphran Elephant Ground & Zoo is a famous tourist places suitable for all ages and located in Tha Kham, Sam Phran, Nakhon Pathom Province, central Thailand.

General 
Samphran Elephant Ground & Zoo was established by Mr. Pichai Chaimongkoltrakul. The zoo officially opened to the public on March 24, 1985 as a tourist destination, orchid propagation facility and animal breeding especially crocodiles and elephants.

Location 
Samphran Elephant Ground & Zoo is located at 117 Moo 6, Petkasem Rd, Sam Phran, Nakhon Pathom, Thailand, west of Bangkok and about 40 kilometers from the city.

Main show 
The elephant theme show and the crocodile wrestling show are the highlight events in this zoo.

Elephant theme show 
In the elephant show, the elephants dance, race, paint and play “Yutha Hathi”, a royal battle in Thai history which is performed with actors riding on the elephants.

Crocodile wrestling 
For the crocodile wrestling, performers show the visitors how to catch crocodiles with their bare hands and also put their arms or heads inside the crocodile’s jaws.

Show time

The zoo open is daily from 08.30 A.M. – 05.30 P.M.

Visitors can ride the elephants and visit tropical gardens and waterfalls around the zoo. They can visit orchid nursery and the crocodile’s nursery. Located at the zoo is the ‘Erawan Restaurant’ which provides international cuisine and offers food for visitors if they are hungry throughout the day.

References 

Zoos in Thailand
Tourist attractions in Nakhon Pathom province